Hornbeams (Carpinus species) are used as food plants by the larvae (caterpillars) of a number of Lepidoptera species, including the following.

Apatelodidae
 Spotted apatelodes, Apatelodes torrefacta – recorded on Carpinus caroliniana in the United States

Arctiinae
 Banded tussock moth, tessellated halisidota or pale tiger moth, Halysidota tessellaris – recorded on Carpinus caroliniana in Canada
 Fall webworm, Hyphantria cunea – recorded on Carpinus caroliniana in Canada
 Hickory tussock moth or hickory halisidota, Lophocampa caryae – recorded on C. caroliniana in the Nearctic

Coleophoridae
 Coleophora anatipennella — recorded on Carpinus betulus in Europe
 Coleophora currucipennella – in the British Isles
 Coleophora ostryae – in the Nearctic

Drepanidae
 Microblepsis sp. – in the Oriental region

Eriocraniidae
 Eriocrania chrysolepidella – in the British Isles

Gelechiidae
 Dichomeris ustalella – in the Palaearctic
 Dichomeris ventrella – in the Nearctic
 Hypatima rhomboidella – recorded on Carpinus betulus in the Palaearctic
 Recurvaria nanella – recorded on Carpinus betulus in Hungary

Geometridae
 March moth, Alsophila aescularia – in Europe
 Alsophila japonensis – recorded on Carpinus japonica and C. laxiflora – in Japan
 Asthena albulata – in the British Isles
 Besma endropiaria – recorded on Carpinus caroliniana in the Nearctic
 Feathered thorn, Colotois pennaria – recorded on Carpinus betulus in Europe
 Cryptochorina amphidasyaria – recorded on Carpinus cordata in Japan
 Cystidia couaggaria – recorded on Carpinus laxiflora in Japan
 Endropiodes sp. – recorded on Carpinus japonica in Japan
 August thorn, Ennomos quercinaria – recorded on Carpinus betulus in the Palaearctic
 Ennomos subsignaria – recorded on Carpinus caroliniana in Canada
 Autumn moth, Epirrita autumnata – recorded on C. caroliniana in the Nearctic

 Erannis golda – recorded on Carpinus cordata in Japan
 Linden looper or winter moth, Erannis tiliaria – recorded on Carpinus caroliniana in Canada
 Common emerald, Hemithea aestivaria – recorded on Carpinus laxiflora in Japan
 Pale oak beauty, Hypomecis punctinalis – recorded on Carpinus laxiflora in Japan
 Inurois punctigera – recorded on Carpinus japonica and C. laxiflora in Japan
 Little emerald, Jodis lactearia – recorded on Carpinus japonica in Japan
 Jodis putata – recorded on Carpinus japonica in Japan
 Larerannis filipjevi – recorded on Carpinus japonica in Japan
 Lomographa vestaliata – recorded on Carpinus caroliniana in the Nearctic
 White-fringed emerald or flanged looper, Nemoria mimosaria – recorded on C. caroliniana in Canada
 Winter moth, Operophtera brumata – recorded on Carpinus betulus in Finland
 Pachyligia dolosa – recorded on Carpinus japonica in Japan
 Parectropis extersaria – recorded on Carpinus cordata in Japan
 Spiny looper, Phigalia titea – recorded on Carpinus caroliniana in the Nearctic
 Planociampa modesta – recorded on Carpinus laxiflora in Japan
 Probole amicaria – recorded on Carpinus caroliniana in the Nearctic
 Wilemania nitobei – recorded on Carpinus laxiflora in Japan

Gracillariidae
 Caloptilia ostryaeella – recorded in the Nearctic
 Cameraria corylisella – recorded on Carpinus caroliniana in the Nearctic
 Cameraria ostryarella – recorded on Carpinus caroliniana in the United States
 Parornix carpinella – recorded in the British Isles and on Carpinus betulus in Hungary
 Phyllonorycter carpini – recorded on Carpinus laxiflora in Japan
 Phyllonorycter hikosana – recorded on Carpinus tschonoskii in Japan
 Phyllonorycter japonica – recorded on Carpinus laxiflora in Japan
 Phyllonorycter japonica – recorded on Carpinus tschonoskii in Japan
 Phyllonorycter messaniella – recorded in the British Isles
 Phyllonorycter quinnata – recorded in the British Isles and on Carpinus betulus in Hungary
 Phyllonorycter tenerella – recorded in the British Isles and on Carpinus betulus in Hungary
 Phyllonorycter turugisana – recorded on Carpinus cordata and Carpinus laxiflora in Japan
 Bark miner, Spulerina simploniella – recorded on Carpinus betulus in Europe

Incurvariidae
 Incurvaria pectinea – recorded in the British Isles

Lasiocampidae
 Malacosoma americana – recorded on Carpinus caroliniana in the Nearctic
 Forest tent caterpillar, Malacosoma disstria – recorded in the United States, and on Carpinus caroliniana in the Nearctic

Limacodidae
 Inverted Y slug moth or yellow-collared slug moth, Apoda y-inversum – recorded on Carpinus caroliniana in the United States

Lycaenidae
 Cordelia comes – recorded on Carpinus kawakamii in Taiwan and on Carpinus tschonoskii and Carpinus turczaninowii in China
 Cordelia thespis – recorded on Carpinus turczaninowii in China
 Satyrium liparops – recorded on Carpinus caroliniana in the Nearctic

Lymantriidae
 Gypsy moth, Lymantria dispar – recorded on Carpinus caroliniana in the Nearctic
 White-marked tussock moth, Orgyia leucostigma – recorded on Carpinus caroliniana in the Nearctic

Nepticulidae
 Ectoedemia quadrinotata – recorded on Carpinus caroliniana in the Nearctic
 Stigmella carpinella – recorded in the British Isles and on Carpinus betulus in Hungary and Lithuania
 Stigmella floslactella – recorded in the British Isles and on Carpinus betulus in Hungary
 Stigmella microtheriella – recorded in the British Isles and on Carpinus betulus in Hungary

Noctuidae
 American dagger moth, Acronicta americana – recorded on Carpinus caroliniana in the Nearctic
 Grey dagger, Acronicta grisea – recorded on Carpinus caroliniana in Canada
 Svensson's copper underwing, Amphipyra berbera – recorded in the British Isles
 Crocigrapha normani – recorded on Carpinus caroliniana in Canada
 Eupsilia tristigmata – recorded on Carpinus caroliniana in Canada
 Confused woodgrain, Morrisonia confusa – recorded on Carpinus caroliniana in the United States
 Zale minerea – recorded on Carpinus caroliniana in Canada

Nolidae
 Baileya dormitans – recorded on Carpinus caroliniana in Canada
 Baileya ophthalmica – recorded on Carpinus caroliniana in Canada

Notodontidae
 Cnethodonta grisescens – recorded in Japan
 Datana ministra – recorded on Carpinus caroliniana in Canada
 Hagapteryx admirabilis – recorded in Japan
 Heterocampa guttivitta – recorded on Carpinus caroliniana in Canada
 Heterocampa umbrata – recorded on Carpinus caroliniana in the Nearctic
 Hexafrenum leucodera – recorded in Japan
 Himeropteryx miraculosa – recorded in Japan
 Lophocosma atriplaga – recorded in Japan
 Ptilophora nohirae – recorded on Carpinus japonica in Japan
 Schizura leptinoides – recorded on Carpinus caroliniana in Canada

 Lobster moth, Stauropus fagi – recorded in Japan

Nymphalidae
 Bremeria schrenkii – recorded on Carpinus cordata in the former USSR
 White admiral or red-spotted purple, Limenitis arthemis – recorded on Carpinus caroliniana in the United States
 Neptis nemorosa – recorded in China
 Neptis philyroides – recorded on Carpinus kawakamii and Carpinus minutiserrata in Taiwan

Oecophoridae
 Menesta tortriciformella – recorded on Carpinus caroliniana in the Nearctic
 Nites maculatella – recorded on Carpinus caroliniana in the Nearctic
 Semioscopis avellanella – recorded in the British Isles

Pantheidae
 Nut-tree tussock moth, Colocasia coryli – recorded on Carpinus betulus in Finland

Papilionidae
 Eastern tiger swallowtail, Papilio glaucus – recorded on Carpinus caroliniana in the United States

Psychidae
 Evergreen bagworm, Thyridopteryx ephemeraeformis – recorded on Carpinus caroliniana in the Holarctic

Pyralidae
 Acrobasis carpinivorella – recorded on Carpinus caroliniana in the United States
 Acrobasis ostryella – recorded in the Nearctic
 Agrotera nemoralis – recorded in the British Isles and on Carpinus betulus in Italy

Saturniidae
 Luna moth, Actias luna – recorded in Canada and on Carpinus betulus in the Nearctic
 Tau emperor, Aglia tau – recorded on Carpinus betulus in the Palaearctic
 Anisota virginiensis – recorded in the United States and on Carpinus caroliniana in Canada
 Antheraea paphia – recorded on Carpinus betulus in the Oriental region (= Antheraea mylitta)
 Chinese (oak) tussar moth, Chinese tasar moth or temperate tussar moth, Antheraea pernyi – recorded in the Palaearctic
 Polyphemus moth, Antheraea polyphemus – recorded on Carpinus caroliniana in Canada
 Atlas moth, Attacus atlas – recorded on Carpinus betulus in the Oriental region
 Io moth, Automeris io – recorded on Carpinus caroliniana in the United States
 Imperial moth, Eacles imperialis – recorded on Carpinus caroliniana in the Nearctic
 Cecropia moth, Hyalophora cecropia – recorded on Carpinus caroliniana in Canada
 Ceanothus silkmoth, Hyalophora euryalus – recorded in the Nearctic
 Lonomia cynira – recorded on Carpinus betulus in the Neotropical region
 Periphoba hircia – recorded the Neotropical region
 Ailanthus silkmoth, Samia cynthia – recorded on Carpinus betulus in the Oriental region

Sesiidae
 Synanthedon spuleri – recorded on Carpinus betulus in the Palaearctic
 Synanthedon tenue – recorded on Carpinus japonica in Japan

Sphingidae
 Walnut sphinx, Amorpha juglandis – recorded in the Nearctic
 Blinded sphinx, Paonias excaecatus – recorded on Carpinus caroliniana in the United States
 Twin-spotted sphinx, Smerinthus jamaicensis – recorded on Carpinus caroliniana in the Nearctic

Tortricidae
 Acleris cristana – recorded on Carpinus betulus in Europe
 Acleris delicatana – recorded on Carpinus japonica in Japan
 Acleris sparsana – recorded in the British Isles and on Carpinus betulus in Europe
 Acleris umbrana – recorded on Carpinus betulus in Europe
 Aleimma loeflingiana – recorded in the British Isles and on Carpinus betulus in Europe
 Archips argyrospila – recorded in the Nearctic
 Archips viola – recorded on Carpinus cordata in Russia
 Capua vulgana – recorded on Carpinus betulus in Europe
 Clepsis consimilana – recorded on Carpinus betulus in Europe
 Dark fruit-tree tortrix, Pandemis heparana – recorded in Europe
 Pandemis lamprosana – recorded on Carpinus caroliniana in the United States
 Pseudohedya retracta – recorded on Carpinus cordata in Russia
 Maple-basswood leafroller, Sparganothis pettitana – recorded on Carpinus caroliniana in the Nearctic
 Bud moth, Spilonota ocellana – recorded on Carpinus betulus (cosmopolitan)
 Strophedra weirana – recorded on Carpinus betulus in Europe
 Tortricodes alternella – recorded on Carpinus betulus in Europe
 Tortricodes tortricella – recorded in the Palaearctic
 Green oak moth or European oak leafroller, Tortrix viridana – recorded on Carpinus betulus in Europe

Yponomeutidae
 Ypsolopha costella – recorded in the Palaearctic
 Ypsolopha parenthesella – recorded in the British Isles

External links

Carpinus
+Lepidoptera